Round Hill is a location in Dartmouth, Massachusetts of historical significance.

History

Original description
The first historical description of the hill was by Gabriel Archer, who kept a record of the 1602 expedition of Bartholomew Gosnold from Falmouth, Cornwall to what was then known as Northern Virginia. On May 25, 1602 (o.s.), the vessel Concord having first entering Buzzards Bay (which the crew called Gosnolls Hope) from Vineyard Sound, they determined to make the west side of on an islet within Cuttyhunk Island their settlement. From that island Archer saw the a hill on the mainland which he called "Hap's Hill," "for that I hope much hap may be expected from it." On May 31, Captain Gosnold sailed to the mainland, anchored and came ashore. There he was welcomed by native men, women and children "who with all courteous kindnesse entertayned him …," presenting him with furs (thought valuable by Archer), tobacco, turtles, hemp, chains and other ornaments. The landing party explored the coast finding it to be, in the words of Archer, "the goodliest continent that ever we saw, promising more by farre than we any way did expect … ." Exploring the coast they discovered Hap's Island between two inlets. On the basis of the description, Hurd determined that what Archer called Hap's Hill was later referred to as "Round Hill."

Ned Green and M.I.T.
Edward Howland Robinson Green, known as "Colonel" Ned Green, the only son of the renowned female tycoon and miser, Hetty Green, built his home on Round Hill after his mother's death in 1916 left him and his sister with a fortune of between $100 and $200 million. The mansion was designed by architect Alfred C. Bossom and completed in 1921 at a cost of $1.5 million.

In 1948, twelve years after the Colonel's death, his sister Sylvia Green, his heir, donated the entire property to the Massachusetts Institute of Technology (MIT), which used the  estate for educational and military purposes until 1964. MIT erected a giant antenna atop a 50,000-gallon water tank on the site. Another was erected nearby for research towards the Ballistic Missile Early Warning System. The giant dish antenna stood as a local and marine navigational landmark until the current owners of the site, the Bevelaqua family, demolished it in 2007.

In 1964 MIT sold the estate to the Society of Jesus of New England. It adapted the mansion as a religious retreat center. Its upper floors were converted into 64 individual rooms, and its main floor reworked to include a chapel, conference rooms, and library. In 1968 the Jesuits sold much of the estate's beach to the Town of Dartmouth. In 1970 it sold the entire property to Gratia R. Montgomery, a local woman. In 1981 she sold most of the site to private developers. They developed it as a private, gated condominium community.

Radio research and WMAF 

Col. Green had an early fascination with radio technology, dating back to the 1890s, and in June 1922, the Round Hills Radio Corporation was incorporated under a Massachusetts charter, with Colonel Green the company president. To support the radio operations, a building containing a broadcast studio plus laboratory rooms was constructed adjacent to the estate's main building. In September 1922, the Round Hills Radio Corporation received licenses for a broadcasting station, WMAF, in addition to one for experimental work, with the call sign 1XV. The broadcasting station, which was operated only during the summer months of 1923-1928, adopted the slogan The Voice from Way Down East.

MIT's President, Samuel W. Stratton and the Department of Electrical Engineering's new Communications Division were invited to experiment with the new technology, and the department was initially financed by Green. Professor Edward L. Bowles set out to determine the signal strength and radiation patterns of different antenna arrays in 1926. Round Hill's radio station (which included an early radio telescope, built atop a water tower designed to look like the foundation of a lighthouse) followed Donald B. MacMillan's and Admiral Richard E. Byrd's polar expeditions, tracked the Graf Zeppelin dirigible during its maiden transatlantic flight, and was the sole communication link for areas devastated by the Vermont floods in 1927.

Van de Graaff 
In 1933, Round Hill was the site of Robert J. Van de Graaff's electrical experiments. Van de Graaff had been brought to MIT from Princeton in 1931 to develop a high voltage research facility. The purpose was to provide the energy to accelerate subatomic particles to bombard atomic nuclei. The machine became operational in December 1933. It was capable of operating at 5,000,000 volts. After it became obsolete, the generator was donated in 1956 to the Museum of Science, Boston, and circa 2011 the generator continues to function as a major exhibit.

Charles W. Morgan 

The New Bedford whaling ship Charles W. Morgan, now on display at Mystic Seaport, was once owned in part by Colonel Green, and moored at Round Hill.

World War II 
During World War II, the Coast Artillery built a fire control structure on the site. This site was known as the Mishaum Point Military Reservation.

Recent developments 
In 2007 the property was bought for around $8.5 million. On November 19, 2007, the antenna was demolished by the new owner, who planned to build a new home on the site.

References and sources

References

Sources

 

  

  The original imprint was "In fower parts, each containing five bookes." All four volumes are hosted online by the Library of Congress The 1905–07 facsimile reproduction (Glasgow: J. MacLehose and sons), in 20 volumes (one for each of the "bookes") is hosted online by HathiTrust.

External links

General
The Center for Land Use Interpretation's page about the Round Hill Lab Site
A citation of "84 cubic feet" of records that mention "Round Hill, an estate left to the Institute by E. H. R. Green as a home for research in aeronautics and microwave technology"
About Round Hill Community
PALATIAL HOME FOR COLONEL E.H.R. GREEN SON OF HETTY GREEN  "...probably be one of the finest and most imposing country dwellings in the East."
The Voice From Way Down East - 1923 WMAF promotion brochure

Robert J. Van de Graaff
A short history of Van de Graaff's work at Round Hill
Photos from a 1933 report on Van de Graaff's generator at Round Hill

Later use
Brief mention of Round Hill's use by NASA in 1960

Beaches of Massachusetts
Dartmouth, Massachusetts
Hills of Massachusetts
History of Bristol County, Massachusetts
Landforms of Bristol County, Massachusetts
Tourist attractions in Bristol County, Massachusetts